Soham Ghosh (born 29 March 1986) is an Indian former cricketer. He played three first-class matches for Bengal in 2007/08.

See also
 List of Bengal cricketers

References

External links
 

1986 births
Living people
Indian cricketers
Bengal cricketers
People from Baharampur